Grand Ayatollah Agha Mojtaba Tehrani (Persian: مجتبي تهراني) (4 April 1933 – 1 January 2013) was an Iranian Twelver Shi'a Marja' taqlid, which is described as "a high-ranking Shia cleric who is regarded as a source of emulation".

Tehrani studied at the Islamic seminary in Qum under the future Grand Ayatollah Ruhollah Khomeini, and he wrote a personal Resalah, a legal manual of edicts on Islamic law. He was "imam of one of Tehran's largest and most important mosques". Ali Khamenei, the Supreme Leader of Iran attended his funeral procession.

References

External links

Official website (in Farsi)
Mojtaba Tehrani's Resalah (in Persian)

See also
List of deceased Maraji

Iranian grand ayatollahs
Iranian Islamists
Shia Islamists
1933 births
2013 deaths
People from Tehran
Iranian people of Kurdish descent